Xiangyu Zhou (Zhou Xiangyu, 周向宇, born March 1965 in Chenzhou, Hunan Province) is a Chinese mathematician, specializing in several complex variables and complex geometry. He is known for his 1998 proof of the "extended future tube conjecture", which was an unsolved problem for almost forty years.

Education and career
Zhou matriculated in 1981 at Xiangtan University, where he graduated in 1985 with a bachelor's degree in mathematics. From 1985 to 1990 he studied at the Institute of Mathematics of the Chinese Academy of Sciences, where he received an M.Sc. in 1988 and a Ph.D. in 1990. At Beijing's Institute of Mathematics of the Chinese Academy of Sciences he was from 1990 to 1992 an assistant professor and from 1992 to 1998 an associate professor and is since 1998 a full professor. During 1990 to 1992 he was on academic leave as a senior scientific member of the Steklov Mathematical Institute, where he was awarded in 1998 a Russian Doctor of Sciences degree.

In the Chinese Academy of Sciences, Zhou was from 2003 to 2012 the director of the Institute of Mathematics and is since 2008 the director of the Hua Loo-Keng Key Laboratory of Mathematics. From 2008 to 2011 he was the vice-chair of the Chinese Mathematical Society.

Zhou was awarded in 1999 the First Class Prize of the Natural Science Award of the Chinese Academy of Sciences, in 2001 the S.S. Chern Mathematics Prize of the Chinese Mathematical Society, and in 2004 the National Natural Science Award of China of the State Council of China. In 2002 he was an invited speaker at the International Congress of Mathematicians in Beijing. In 2013 he was elected an Academician by the Chinese Academy of Sciences and was a keynote speaker of the Abel Symposium.

Selected publications
 
 
 
 
 
 
 
 
 
 
 
  2018

References

1965 births
Living people
20th-century Chinese mathematicians
21st-century Chinese mathematicians
People from Chenzhou
Xiangtan University alumni
Members of the Chinese Academy of Sciences
Members of the 14th Chinese People's Political Consultative Conference